The Crystal Gazebo is a 1932 American Pre-Code short animated film distributed by Columbia Pictures, and one of the numerous featuring Krazy Kat.

Plot
In a multi-domed palace somewhere in the Middle East, a jackal wearing a turban is looking at things monitored by his crystal ball. Besides being able to see, the jackal can also touch and take things shown by the ball.  He spots Krazy riding on a camel with his girlfriend, a spaniel. The jackal kills the camel and kidnaps the spaniel.

Krazy is able to find a replacement camel inside the dead camel and rides it to the palace. With the entrance blocked by two hippo guards, Krazy drills his way in. Inside, Krazy finds the jackal and the spaniel. The jackal flees through an elevator while holding the spaniel. Krazy tries to enter a door, but the door crushes him against the wall, and sends him through a hole, which becomes narrow, then wide, then swirly. He gets past a pack of mummies that try to pound him with a bat. Then the cat gets trapped inside a transparent clock with a giant knife moving within. Next a bee stings him and he turns fat and floats upward, bringing the clock with him. Two birds peck the back of the clock, opening it, and pinch Krazy, making him deflate to his regular size.

Krazy reaches a room where he again  finds the jackal and the spaniel, while the Poet and Peasant overture begins to play. The jackal tosses an urn at Krazy, who responds by throwing punches at the jackal. The spaniel joins Krazy in striking her captor. Finally the jackal is slammed against a wall where bottles fall from a shelf. The jackal slams a TNT bottle on the ground, and it explodes.

At this point, Krazy and the spaniel wake up on a sofa from the nightmare they were having, and hear a radio in the room telling the end of a story about a magician.

See also
 Krazy Kat filmography

References

External links
The Crystal Gazebo at the Big Cartoon Database
 

1932 films
American animated short films
American black-and-white films
1932 animated films
Krazy Kat shorts
Columbia Pictures short films
1930s American animated films
Films about dreams
Films set in the Middle East
Films set in palaces
Columbia Pictures animated short films
Screen Gems short films
1930s English-language films